This is a list of current and previous Australian Army bases.

Former Bases

Western Australia 

 Leeuwin Barracks, Fremantle (vacated in 2017)
 Northam Army Camp, Northam (vacated in TBA)

References

Australian Defence Force bases
Australian Army bases
Installations
Australia